East Nanjing Road is an interchange station between Lines 2 and 10 on the Shanghai Metro. It is located in Huangpu District, under the intersection of Nanjing Road (E.) and Henan Road (M.) in the city center of Shanghai.

During the National Day and other major festivals, Nanjing East Road will close the station during certain periods, and trains will not stop at this station during the closed period.

Before October 2006, it was known as Middle Henan Road station. The name was changed according to the new convention to name metro stations after famous streets or sights nearby rather than the vertical street neighbouring the station, making it easier for visitors to find these places.

The interchange with the main branch of Line 10 section of the station opened on 10 April 2010.

Station Layout

Places nearby
 Nanjing Road (E.) - a pedestrian-only shopping street
 Fuzhou Road with many bookstores
 The Bund - overlooking the Huangpu River
 Renji Hospital (West Part)
 Holy Trinity Cathedral, Shanghai

References

Three Metro station names will be changed (Shanghai Daily)

Railway stations in Shanghai
Railway stations in China opened in 1999
Line 2, Shanghai Metro
Line 10, Shanghai Metro
Shanghai Metro stations in Huangpu District